Traces is the third album by Classics IV, released in 1969 on Imperial Records. The album was released in Japan as Everyday with You Girl, albeit with different sequencing and three additional tracks included.

The album peaked at No. 45 on the Billboard Top LPs, making it the band's most successful album. The title track and "Everyday with You Girl" are both Top 20 hits on the Billboard Hot 100 and Easy Listening charts.

Reception
The album was met with positive reviews. Billboard praised the album for its top arrangement, production and performance. Greg Adams of AllMusic praised the album for the songs' poetic lyrics and the soft instrumental blend of strings and occasional flute, but states that their song covers have more quality compared to their original songs. The Rolling Stone Album Guide called the title song one of the group's "mandatory furtive-grope numbers at proms of the period," writing that it "later became an elevator music" standard.

Track listing
All songs are written by Buddy Buie and J. R. Cobb, except where noted.

Personnel
Production
Producer: Buddy Buie
Photography: Howard Erik

Charts
Album

Singles

References

External links

1969 albums
Imperial Records albums
Classics IV albums
Albums produced by Buddy Buie